Kingsmuir is a small village in Angus, one mile south-east of Forfar on the B9128 Carnoustie to Forfar road.

References

Villages in Angus, Scotland